Legs Diamond is the eponymous debut album by the American rock band Legs Diamond.

In 1989, Kerrang! magazine listed the album at No. 33 among the "100 Greatest Heavy Metal Albums of All Time".

Track listings

2000 Zoom Club CD version and 2007 Diamond Records CD version bonus track
"Come with Me" (Legs Diamond) – 4:41

2018 Rock Candy Records CD version bonus tracks
"Come with Me"	(Album Outtake)
 "Rat Race" (1976 K-West Radio)
"Thrill Seeker" (Demo)
"High School Queen" (Demo)
"Not Yours Not Mine" (Demo)
"Deadly Dancer" (Demo)	
"One Way Ticket" (Demo)
"Avalanche" (Demo)
"Traces" (Demo)
"Street Runner" (Demo)	
"Closer" (Demo)
"Food for Thought" (Demo)

Personnel
Legs Diamond
 Rick Sanford – lead vocals, flute, percussion
 Roger Romeo – lead guitar, lead vocals
 Michael Prince – rhythm guitar, keyboards, vocals
 Michael "Diamond" Gargano – bass guitar
 Jeff Poole – drums, percussion

Production
Derek Lawrence – producer
Peter Granet – engineer
David Gertz – assistant engineer

References

1976 debut albums
Mercury Records albums
Albums produced by Derek Lawrence
Albums recorded at Wally Heider Studios